Ziz is a creature in Jewish mythology.

Ziz may refer to:

Gerry and Ziz, a Canadian TV series
Johann Baptist Ziz (1779–1829), German botanist
Ziz, the Phoenician name for Palermo, Italy
ZIZ Broadcasting Corporation of St. Kitts & Nevis
Ziz Gorges, Morocco
Ziz River, southern Morocco and Algeria